Tang Kuo-cheng was a Chinese politician. She was among the first group of women elected to the Legislative Yuan in 1948.

Biography
Returning to China, she became headteacher at Ningxia Provincial Girls' High School. She joined the Kuomintang and was a delegate to its sixth national congress. She became a member of the Central Women's Movement Committee and chair of Nanjing Women's Association.

Tang was a delegate to the 1946  that drew up the constitution of the Republic of China. She was subsequently a Kuomintang candidate in Hunan in the 1948 elections for the Legislative Yuan, and was elected to parliament. She relocated to Taiwan during the Chinese Civil War, where she remained a member of the Legislative Yuan until 1991.

References

Date of birth unknown
Members of the Kuomintang
Chinese schoolteachers
20th-century Chinese women politicians
Members of the 1st Legislative Yuan
Members of the 1st Legislative Yuan in Taiwan
Date of death unknown